Pierre-André d'Héguerty (1700–1763) was a French economist.

1700 births
1763 deaths
People from Dinan
French economists
Governors of Réunion